Thomas Bentley (1880–1950) was a British film director.

Thomas Bentley may also refer to:

 Thomas Bentley (manufacturer) (1731–1780), English manufacturer of porcelain, known for his partnership with Josiah Wedgwood
 Thomas John Bentley (1891–1983), Canadian politician, agrologist, farmer and organizer
(Thomas) Whitefield Bentley (1884–1952), life insurance company manager and political figure on Prince Edward Island
 Thomas Bentley, editor of The Monument of Matrones (1582)
Tom Bentley, author and policy analyst based in Australia

See also
Tom Bentley Throckmorton (1885–1961), American neurologist